The alpha-1A adrenergic receptor (α1A adrenoreceptor), also known as ADRA1A, formerly known also as the  alpha-1C adrenergic receptor, is an alpha-1 adrenergic receptor, and also denotes the human gene encoding it. There is no longer a subtype α1C receptor. At one time, there was a subtype known as α1C, but it was found to be identical to the previously discovered α1A receptor subtype. To avoid confusion, the naming convention was continued with the letter D.

Receptor
There are 3 alpha-1 adrenergic receptor subtypes: alpha-1A, -1B and -1D, all of which signal through the Gq/11 family of G-proteins.  Different subtypes show different patterns of activation.  The majority of alpha-1 receptors are directed toward the function of epinephrine, a hormone that has to do with the fight-or-flight response.

Gene
This gene encodes the alpha-1A-adrenergic receptor. Alternative splicing of this gene generates four transcript variants, which encode four different isoforms with distinct C-termini but having similar ligand binding properties.

Ligands

Agonists
 6-(5-fluoro-2-pyrimidin-5-yl-phenyl)-6,7-dihydro-5H-pyrrolo[1,2-a]imidazole: EC50 = 1nM, Emax = 65%; good selectivity over α1B, α1D and α2A subtypes
 further partial agonistic imidazole compounds
 A-61603
 Metaraminol

Antagonists
 Tamsulosin: for treatment of benign prostatic hyperplasia
 Silodosin: for treatment of benign prostatic hyperplasia
 Doxazosin: for treatment of benign prostatic hyperplasia and/or Hypertension
 Risperidone: used to treat schizophrenia and bipolar disorder
 WB-4101
 Ziprasidone
 Most tricyclic antidepressants

Role in neural circuits 
α1A-adrenergic receptor subtypes increase inhibition at dendrodendritic synapses, suggesting a synaptic mechanism for noradrenergic modulation of olfactory driven behaviors.

See also
Adrenergic receptor

References

External links

Further reading

Adrenergic receptors